Emergency is an Australian factual television series that looks at the everyday working of doctors and nurses in the Royal Melbourne Hospital, and is narrated by Australian actress Susie Godfrey.

The show premiered on 8 July 2020, and focuses on the reveal the tribulations and triumphs of the Royal's dedicated doctors and nurses as they deal with victims of vicious assaults, horror car crashes and other tragedies, caring for the constant stream of patients coming through the door every day.

The show was renewed for a second season, which began airing 24 May 2021. Season 3 aired from 18 July 2022. A fourth season was announced in 2022.

Episodes

Series overview

Season 1 (2020)

Season 2 (2021)

Season 3 (2022)

References

Nine Network original programming
2020 Australian television series debuts
Australian factual television series
English-language television shows